Ge Ping may refer to:

 Ge Ping (athlete), Chinese high jumper
 Ge Ping (voice actor), Chinese voice actor